Sliač is a small spa town located in central Slovakia, on the Hron river, between Banská Bystrica and Zvolen. The town is known for its healing hot springs and for an airport which has been used for military as well as civil purposes. Sliač has a population of less than 5,000.

History
The town arose through a merger of two villages, Hájniky and Rybáre, in 1959 and was given the name "Sliač". However, both original settlements are much older. The Gothic church in Hájniky was mentioned for the first time in 1263 (when the territory belonged to the Kingdom of Hungary) and there is archaeological evidence of Slavic settlers living in the area since the 6th century. Some evidence also indicates that the history of the settlement stretches to 2000 B.C. Sliač Airport, formerly known as Letisko Tri Duby ("The Three-Oaks Airport") due to the name of the area it was located in, played the key strategic role during the Slovak National Uprising.

Demographics
In 2018, Sliač had a population of 4,986. According to the 2001 census, 96.1% of inhabitants were Slovaks and 2.3% Czechs. The religious make-up was 46.1% Roman Catholics, 26.7% people with no religious affiliation, and 22.1% Lutherans.

Twin towns — sister cities

Sliač is twinned with:
 Přibyslav, Czech Republic

References

External links
Official website of the municipality 
Sliač dnes: Website about events in Sliac 
Health Spa Sliač
Sliač International Airport
History, present and comparison of spa Sliač 

Cities and towns in Slovakia
Spa towns in Slovakia